Niccolò di Pietro, also Niccolo di Pietro Veneziano, Niccolo Paradiso, (active late 14th century-early 15th century) was a Sienese School painter of Medieval art. The date of his birth and death are unknown.

Family life
In the archival documents and in inscriptions on paintings of his name can be traced from 1394 to 1430: in 1394 his name appeared on the first available date of the picture, in 1430, referred to the last time the document associated with the wedding of his daughter Antonia. For some of his work the artist signed Nicolo Paradiso, indicating that he lived in Venice near the bridge Paradiso.

Niccolò di Pietro belonged to an artistic dynasty that, at least in three generations played a prominent role in the artistic life in Venice. His grandfather Nicolo is referred to as an artist, his father Pietro di Niccolo mentioned in the contracts with the painters of his generation - Donato and Katarina (no signed works of him left, Italian scientist Andrea De Marchi believes that the so-called Master of polyptych Torre di Palme and Pietro di Niccolo - it is one and the same artist). In recent years, more and more approved by the view that the most famous Venetian painter of the second half of the 14th century Lorenzo Veneziano was the brother of the father of the artist - Pietro di Niccolo. If this theory is correct, then Nicolo di Pietro, therefore, was the nephew of Lorenzo.

Style and influences
As in the work of Lorenzo and Niccolo di Pietro pronounced tendency to adapt Gothic painting, the researchers believe that this family was the main promoter of the North, the Gothic influence in Venetian art. On the other hand, it can be seen in the works of Niccolo an influence of the Bolognese school, which in the 14th century by such masters as Vitale da Bologna, Tommaso da Modena and Giovanni da Bologna, was one of the leaders in the development of a more realistic and lifelike reading religious subjects. In this regard, some researchers believe that Niccolo di Pietro could be a disciple of Giovanni da Bologna, as in the will of the latter from 23 to 24 October 1389 referred to a «Nicolao suo disipulo» («his student Nicole").

In addition, Nicolo di Pietro was a contemporary of the famous master Gentile da Fabriano, perhaps the best Italian artist who worked in the style of international Gothic; Gentile in 1408 to perform work in the Venetian Doge's Palace, and his refined manners could not affect the later works of Niccolo.

Works and attributions
There are only two signed artist work around which researchers with varying degrees of confidence collect stylistically similar works, attributing them Nicolo. In the world's museums and private collections is a series of paintings, which can be attributed to the Venetian painting of the 14th and 15th centuries; attribution of some of them varies from one critic to another.

References
 M. Lucco, "Nicolo di Pietro" in Painting in Italy. The thirteenth and fourteenth centuries. Milan 1986 pp. 643–644
 A. De Marchi, for a review of the late Gothic painting in Venice: Niccolò di Pietro and its context Adriatic, Art Bulletin, LXXII 1987 p. 42
 K. Christiansen, Painting in Venice and the Veneto in the early fifteenth century. Milan 1987 pp. 123–125, 129–130.
 A.De Brands, Back to Nicolò di Pietro, in "New studies. Journal of ancient and modern art, "II, 1997 3 pp. 5–24, speciatim pp. 10 and 20 footnote 57.
 Cathleen Hoeniger in Painting in the Veneto: The fourteenth century. Milan, 1992, p. 456
 C. Pietrangeli. Paintings in The Vatican. Bulfinch Press, 1996 pp 160–161, 579-580

External links

Italian Paintings, Venetian School, a collection catalog containing information about di Pietro and his works (see index; plate 50).

Year of birth unknown
Year of death unknown
14th-century Italian painters
Italian male painters
15th-century Italian painters